Michael Anthony Wong (born January 14, 1955 in Minneapolis, Minnesota) is an American retired ice hockey forward who played in 22 games for the Detroit Red Wings during the 1975–76 season. He is also a former Minnesota Golden Gloves boxing champion. He was drafted 7th (77th overall) in the 1975 NHL Amateur Draft. Wong is of Chinese descent.

Professional career
Wong played junior hockey in Minnesota and was called upon to join the American national junior team 1974 World Junior Championships. This was the first year of the tournament and was held in Leningrad. Wong did not score a point in five games.

Wong joined the Montreal Bleu Blanc Rouge of the Quebec Major Junior Hockey League. In the 1974–75 season he recorded 27 goals and 41 assists for 67 points. The Red Wings selected Wong with their 7th pick, 77th overall, in the 1975 NHL Amateur Draft. Wong was also drafted 61st overall in the 1974 WHA Amateur Draft by the Indianapolis Racers of the World Hockey Association.

Wong started the season with the Kalamazoo Wings of the International Hockey League, in which he scored 42 points in 39 games. He was called up to play for Detroit on October 11, 1975 for a game against the California Golden Seals. He remained with Detroit for 22 games, and scored one goal and one assist. He ended his time in the NHL with a plus/minus rating of -11.

For the next three seasons, Wong would split his time between Kalamazoo and several other teams. He played for the Rhode Island Reds of the American Hockey League in 1976–77, the Muskegon Mohawks of the IHL in 1977–78, and the Johnstown Wings of the North East Hockey League in 1978–79. He retired from pro hockey after the 1978–79 season.

After pro hockey
Wong returned to Minnesota spent several years in Bloomington, Minnesota playing for Buck's Unpainted Furniture U.S. senior elite team, he married his high school sweetheart. He later coached his son Jason's youth hockey teams in Minnesota. Jason went on to play junior and college hockey in Minnesota.

Career statistics

Regular season and playoffs

International

External links
 
Mike Wong's Bio on Hockey Draft Central.com

1955 births
Living people
American men's ice hockey centers
American sportspeople of Chinese descent
Detroit Red Wings draft picks
Detroit Red Wings players
Ice hockey people from Minneapolis
Indianapolis Racers draft picks
Kalamazoo Wings (1974–2000) players
Montreal Bleu Blanc Rouge players
Muskegon Mohawks players
Native American sportspeople
Providence Reds players